Grewia oxyphylla is an Australian species of flowering plant in the mallow family, Malvaceae.

References

oxyphylla
Flora of Australia
Taxa named by Max Burret